The Penicillin is an IBA official cocktail made with Scotch whisky, ginger, honey syrup, and fresh lemon juice.

History 
The drink was created in 2005 by Australian bartender Sam Ross living in New York at the time. Its name derives from the drug penicillin, discovered by Scottish scientist Alexander Fleming, hinting to the medicinal properties of some of its ingredients, with suggested effects similar to that of a hot toddy which is said to relieve the symptoms of cold and flu.

It was first served in 2005 at Milk & Honey.

See also
 List of cocktails

References

Cocktails with Scotch whisky
Cocktails with lemon juice
Sweet cocktails